Scott Corner is an unincorporated community in Union Township, Randolph County, in the U.S. state of Indiana.

In the 19th century, it was the home of several families free African Americans, part of the Cabin Creek Settlement. The name derives from Robert Scott, who was born enslaved in Guilford County, North Carolina in 1770. After gaining his freedom, he moved in 1821 to Wayne County, Indiana, then in 1832 to what would become known as Scott's Corner. The "corner" in the name marks the location of a grocery store owned by Eleazer Scott, a grandson of Robert's.

Geography

References

Unincorporated communities in Randolph County, Indiana
Unincorporated communities in Indiana